The 5th Aerobic Gymnastics European Championships was held in Szombathely, Hungary, November 18–25, 2007.

Results

Medal table

References
Results (PDF file)

2007
2007 in gymnastics
International gymnastics competitions hosted by Hungary
2007 in Hungarian sport